The Wiener Medizinische Wochensschrift is a medical journal published by Springer Verlag, Vienna. The Österreichische Nationalbibliothek has made old copies available over the Internet.

References 

General medical journals
Springer Science+Business Media academic journals